The Edinburg Formation is an Ordovician-age geological formation in Virginia. It is primarily composed of basinal (deep sea) limestone and shale, and is one of the younger units in the "Middle Ordovician" sequence of the Shenandoah Valley. However, fossils have shown that it actually was deposited in the early part of the Late Ordovician. There are two major facies encompassed by the Edinburg Formation. The more abundant Liberty Hall facies consist of evenly bedded black limestone and shale. In a few areas, the Liberty Hall facies intertongue with the Lantz Mill facies. The Lantz Mill facies are grainy or cobbly wackestone which weathers to a buff brown color. Fossils are diverse, including graptolites, brachiopods, and trilobites.

References 

Ordovician geology of Virginia